Ushant is a French island at the southwestern end of the English Channel which marks the westernmost point of metropolitan France. It belongs to Brittany and, in medieval terms, Léon. In lower tiers of government, it is a commune in the Finistère department. It is the only place in Brittany, save for Brittany itself, with a separate name in English.

Geography
Neighbouring islets include Keller Island and Kadoran to the north.

Ushant marks a southern limit of the Celtic Sea and the southern end to the western English Channel, the northern end being the Isles of Scilly, southwest of Land's End in Cornwall, England. According to definitions of the International Hydrographic Organization the island lies outside the English Channel and is in the Celtic Sea.

The island is a rocky landmass at most , covering .

History
Ushant is famous for its maritime past, both as a fishing community and as a key landmark in the Channel approaches. It is named in the refrain of the sea shanty "Spanish Ladies":

Several naval battles have been fought near Ushant between the British and French navies.

On 23 July 1815 the captive Emperor Napoleon – aboard  towards his final exile – spent several hours on deck watching Ushant, the last part of France he would see.

During World War II, a force of British Commandos and US Army Rangers of the 29th Provisional Rangers successfully attacked a German radar installation on the island, the Battle of Ushant.

According to a repetitive old Breton proverb,  ("Who sees Molène sees his pains (or penalty) / who sees Ushant sees his blood / who sees Sein sees his end / who sees Groix sees his cross"). This proverb underlines local points being often deadly to navigate with many rocks, and tidal streams of more than ten knots.

A standard start and finish line for traditional all-oceans circumnavigations is between Ushant and Lizard Point.

Population
The sole village on the island is Lambaol (Lampaul), which has the mayoral office, school and post office. People also live in the outlying hamlets of  Feuteun Vélen, Frugullou, Pen ar Lan, and Porsguen.

Climate
Under the Köppen climate classification, Ushant features an oceanic climate : temperate, fully humid, temperate summer (Cfb), with generally cool, rainy winters and temperate, drier summers.

Sights
The Creac'h lighthouse is reputedly the most powerful in Europe.  is the French system name for Plymouth in the British system of the Shipping Forecast.

Cultural ties to Scotland
In 2007, Ushant hosted a Scottish book festival and subsequently created their own tartan registered with the Scottish Register of Tartans; and in August 2010, the islanders were reported to be seeking to establish cultural links with a Scottish island. Rob Gibson, Member of the Scottish Parliament for the Highlands and Islands welcomed the suggestion.

Transport 

Ushant is connected to the French mainland by air and sea.  Passenger ferries of the Penn Ar Bed company operate from Brest and Le Conquet year-round, and also from Camaret in summer, stopping at the island of Molène en route. The airline Finistair operates flights on Cessna 208 planes from Brest Bretagne Airport.

Fauna

Ouessant sheep form a rare breed, originating here.  These are northern European short-tailed sheep, ubiquitous in northern Europe up to Roman times, but which now survives only in a few places. Apart from Ushant, these are in remote islands and mountains of Britain and Scandinavia and some places around the Baltic Sea. It is one of the smallest breeds of domestic sheep. It is usually black or dark brown (a few are white), and it is now kept elsewhere in the world as a heritage breed.

The isolation of the island has helped the conservation of the European dark bee (Apis mellifera mellifera), unaffected by pollution, pesticides and Varroa parasites. In the rest of France, it has been substituted by Apis mellifera ligustica. As a side effect, populations of the bee louse, Braula coeca, that has elsewhere perished through pesticides can still be found among the island's bee population. The association  is attempting to conserve and increase the numbers of the European dark bee, intending to reintroduce it in Western France.

Ushant and the Molène archipelago support Europe's southernmost colony of grey seals. They are mostly at Point Cadoran, on Ushant's north coast, where the strong currents keep the water temperature below 15 degrees Celsius (59 °F), the warmest that the seals can tolerate.

Literary and musical references

Ushant is a minor character of Herman Melville's White-Jacket (1850). Ushant is highly admired for his beard.

It is mentioned in the chorus of the sea shanty Spanish Ladies ("From Ushant to Scilly is thirty-five leagues").
Rudyard Kipling mentions it in his poem Anchor Song.
Charles Tournemire's Symphony No. 2, completed in 1909, was inspired by and named for the island.
The 1910 novel  by German author Bernhard Kellermann takes place on the island. Features such as Phare du Creach and Port du Stiff are highly defined. The main character stays at the la Villa des tempêtes, in ruins today.
The secret of the seas, is a 1923 novel by André Savignon set on Ushant.
"Lord Ushant" is the title given the heir to the Duchy of Tintagel (Cornwall) in Edith Wharton's The Buccaneers (1938).
Ushant is mentioned in George Orwell's diaries, in passing.
A ship from Ushant is mentioned in the WWII Brest destruction commemorative ode Barbara by French poet Jacques Prévert.
Ushant is the autobiography of the American poet and novelist Conrad Aiken, published in 1952.
Ushant is one of the many French islands referenced in Laurent Voulzy's Belle-Île-en-Mer, Marie-Galante , a major hit in France since its release in 1986.
Ushant appears over and over in works of Patrick O'Brian as to the whereabouts and course of ships in his book series.
Ushant occasionally appears as a landfall in C. S. Forester's novels about Horatio Hornblower.
Mystery book Act of Mercy by Peter Tremayne is set in 666 AD Ushant and elsewhere.
Ushant is the setting of the 2004 French film  (English title: The Light) directed by Philippe Lioret.
Father Truitard, a character in Bruce Chatwin's The Viceroy of Ouidah, spent "years communing with the waves and petrels on the island of Ushant".
It is mentioned in Dmitry Lukhmanov's narrative 20000 miles under sail.
Yann Tiersen made the album Eusa in 2016. Each track is named after a location on the island.
A trip to the island forms an important plot point in Éric Rohmer's 1996 film A Summer's Tale.

Book awards
The island awards annual literary prizes to worldwide writers.

See also
 Battle of Ushant (disambiguation)
 Communes of the Finistère department
 Parc naturel régional d'Armorique
 List of the works of Charles Cottet depicting scenes of Brittany

References

External links

  Ushant communal council website
  Cultural Heritage
 Article at AllRefer Encyclopedia, based on The Columbia Electronic Encyclopedia
 Traditional, "Spanish Ladies", credited to Iron Men & Wooden Ships, by Frank Shay 
 Ile d'Ouessant - Photo gallery
 Storm Island – article about the island by William Langewiesche in the December 2001 issue of The Atlantic
 

 
Communes of Finistère
Islands of Brittany
Islands of the North Atlantic Ocean